Helmar Mang (born October 8, 1948) is a West German sprint canoer who competed in the mid-1970s. He finished ninth in the K-4 1000 m event at the 1976 Summer Olympics in Montreal.

References

1948 births
Canoeists at the 1976 Summer Olympics
German male canoeists
Living people
Olympic canoeists of West Germany